The Aulic Council (literally meaning Court Council of the Empire) was one of the two supreme courts of the Holy Roman Empire, the other being the Imperial Chamber Court. It had not only concurrent jurisdiction with the latter court, but in many cases exclusive jurisdiction, in all feudal processes, and in criminal affairs, over the immediate feudatories of the Emperor and in affairs which concerned the Imperial Government. The seat of the Aulic Council was at the Hofburg residence of the Habsburg emperors in Vienna.

History

The Aulic Council (from the Latin aula, court in feudal language, in antiquity a Hellenistic type of grand residence, usually private) was originally an executive-judicial council for the Empire. Originating during the Late Middle Ages as a paid Council of the Emperor, it was organized in its later form by the German king Maximilian I by decree of 13 December 1497. It was meant as a rival to the separate Imperial Chamber Court, which the Imperial Estates had forced upon him by promulgating the Ewiger Landfriede at the Diet of Worms two years before. Maximilian emphasised the fact that the Emperor embodied supreme legal authority and would continue to answer legal requests addressed to him.

Each emperor summoned a new Council upon his accession to the throne. According to a regulation issued by Emperor Ferdinand I in 1559, the Council was composed of a president, a vice-president, a vice-chancellor, and 18 councillors, who were all chosen and paid by the Emperor, with the exception of the vice-chancellor, who was appointed by the Elector of Mainz in his capacity as Imperial archchancellor. Of the 18 councilors, six were Protestants, whose votes, when they were unanimous, were an effective veto, so that a religious parity was to some extent preserved. On the death of the Emperor, the Council was dissolved and had to be reconstructed by his successor.

When Napoleon I's gains after the Battle of Austerlitz and the Peace of Pressburg culminated in the end of the Holy Roman Empire, the Aulic Council likewise ceased to exist in 1806 as an imperial institution.

External links 
 Order of the Aulic Council of March 16th, 1654 in full-text (in German)

Sources and references 

  
 (more to be worked in)

Legal history of the Holy Roman Empire
Legal history of Germany
Privy councils
Maximilian I, Holy Roman Emperor